Besselpark is a park in Kreuzberg, Berlin, Germany, named after astronomer and mathematician Friedrich Bessel. The sculpture Tilted Donut Wedge with Two Balls is installed in the park.

References

External links
 

Friedrichshain-Kreuzberg
Parks in Berlin